Cherkassky is a rural locality (a khutor) in Bubnovskoye Rural Settlement, Uryupinsky District, Volgograd Oblast, Russia. The population was 27 as of 2010. There is 1 street.

Geography 
Cherkassky is located in forest steppe, 37 km northwest of Uryupinsk (the district's administrative centre) by road. Bugrovsky is the nearest rural locality.

References 

Rural localities in Uryupinsky District